Phytoecia waltli is a species of beetle in the family Cerambycidae. It was described by Sama in 1991, originally under the genus Neomusaria. It is known from Syria, Lebanon, Jordan, Israel, and Turkey.

References

Phytoecia
Beetles described in 1991